Catherine Lake Historic District is a national historic district located at Catherine Lake, Onslow County, North Carolina.  The district encompasses eight contributing buildings in the mid- to late-19th century community of Catherine Lake.  The district developed between about 1850 and 1900 and includes notable examples of Greek Revival and Italianate style architecture. Notable contributing buildings include the John A. Avirett house (c. 1850), the Jay Franklin Boggs House (c. 1873), and the Rodolph Duffy house (1896).

It was listed on the National Register of Historic Places in 1989.

References

Historic districts on the National Register of Historic Places in North Carolina
Greek Revival architecture in North Carolina
Italianate architecture in North Carolina
Buildings and structures in Onslow County, North Carolina
National Register of Historic Places in Onslow County, North Carolina